Quanah is a city in and the county seat of Hardeman County, Texas, United States. As of the 2010 census the population was 2,641, down from 3,022 at the 2000 census.

History
Quanah was organized in 1884 as a stop on what was then the Fort Worth and Denver City Railway. The city was named for Quanah Parker, the last Comanche chief.

The county seat of Hardeman County was moved from Margaret to Quanah in 1890 after an acrimonious battle that contributed to the splitting off of the southern section of Hardeman County as Foard County.

Geography
Quanah is at the geographic center of Hardeman County, at the intersection of U.S. Route 287 (11th Street) and Texas State Highway 6 (Main Street). US 287 leads southeast  to Vernon and northwest  to Childress. Highway 6 leads south  to Crowell and north  to the Oklahoma border at the Red River.

Climate

Demographics

2020 census

As of the 2020 United States census, there were 2,279 people, 1,088 households, and 700 families residing in the city.

2000 census
As of the census of 2000, there were 3,022 people, 1,255 households, and 823 families residing in the city. Now in 2010 the United States Census as said there are 2,642 people, a drop in population of 390 people. The population density was 866.8 people per square mile (334.3/km). There were 1,485 housing units at an average density of 425.9 per square mile (164.3/km). The racial makeup of the city was 84.1% White, 5.0% African American, 0.4% Native American, 0.4% Asian, 8.2% from other races, and 1.9% from two or more races. Hispanic or Latino of any race were 16.5% of the population.

There were 1,255 households, out of which 29.2% had children under the age of 18 living with them, 51.8% were married couples living together, 10.4% had a female householder with no husband present, and 34.4% were non-families. 31.9% of all households were made up of individuals, and 20.2% had someone living alone who was 65 years of age or older. The average household size was 2.35 and the average family size was 2.96.

In the city, the population was spread out, with 25.1% under the age of 18, 7.9% from 18 to 24, 22.0% from 25 to 44, 22.9% from 45 to 64, and 22.0% who were 65 years of age or older. The median age was 42 years. For every 100 females, there were 87.6 males. For every 100 females age 18 and over, there were 83.2 males.

The median income for a household in the city was $26,354, and the median income for a family was $29,506. Males had a median income of $26,472 versus $18,403 for females. The per capita income for the city was $16,841. About 16.6% of families and 20.7% of the population were below the poverty line, including 29.8% of those under age 18 and 16.4% of those age 65 or over.

Government
Republican Drew Springer, Jr., a businessman from Muenster in Cooke County, has represented Quanah in the Texas House of Representatives since January 2013.

Education
The city is served by the Quanah Independent School District and is home to the Quanah High School Indians.

Infrastructure

Health care
Quanah is home to a branch of the Helen J. Farabee Counseling Centers.

Notable people

 Judy Buenoano, serial killer executed in Florida's electric chair
 Bill Evans, awarded a Bronze Star and Silver Star for valor in World War II; professional baseball player in late 1940s and 1950s
 John Gilliland, radio broadcaster
 Edward Givens, astronaut
 Welborn Griffith, American officer who served during World War II and who was instrumental in saving France's Chartres Cathedral during the battle of Chartres
 Fred C. Koch, chemical engineer and founder of Koch Industries
 Bill McDonald, notable Texas Ranger
 Juli Reding, actress
 Clay Reynolds, Texas author and essayist

References

External links

 City of Quanah official website
 Quanah Chamber of Commerce
 Quanah Independent School District

Cities in Hardeman County, Texas
Cities in Texas
County seats in Texas
1884 establishments in Texas